Fredrik Backman (born 2 June 1981) is a Swedish author, blogger, and columnist. He wrote A Man Called Ove (2012), Things My Son Needs to Know about the World (2012), My Grandmother Asked Me to Tell You She's Sorry (2013), Britt-Marie Was Here (2014), Beartown (2017), Us Against You (2018), Anxious People (2020), and The Winners (2022). The books were number one bestsellers in his home country of Sweden. Backman's books have been published in more than twenty-five languages.

Biography
Backman grew up in Helsingborg, Scania, Sweden. He has been writing for the Swedish newspaper Helsingborgs Dagblad and for the Swedish men's magazine, Moore Magazine. Backman debuted as a novelist in 2012 with A Man Called Ove. The novel was adapted as a film which premiered on December 25, 2015, and again in 2023. The rights to his book Beartown were bought by Swedish production company, Filmlance, and are set to be adapted for television. Many of his books have been translated into English. After his debut novel, A Man Called Ove, was translated into English, it remained on the best seller list for 42 weeks. Following the success of his first book, Atria bought the rights to his other novels and had them translated into English.

Personal life
Fredrik Backman married Neda Shafti Backman in 2009. They have two children. His second book, Things My Son Needs to Know about the World (2012), was based on his own experiences with parenting. He labeled it a "dysfunctional parenting guide" and made a deal that his publisher had to publish the book in order to publish A Man Called Ove.

Bibliography
En man som heter Ove (2012; English translation A Man Called Ove, 2013)
Saker min son behöver veta om världen (2012; English translation Things My Son Needs to Know About the World, 2019)
Min mormor hälsar och säger förlåt (2013; English translation My Grandmother Asked Me to Tell You She's Sorry, 2015)
Britt-Marie var här (2014; English translation Britt-Marie Was Here, released in May 2016)
And Every Morning the Way Home Gets Longer and Longer: A Novella (November 2016)
Beartown (also titled The Scandal in United Kingdom: April 2017)
The Deal of a Lifetime: A Novella (October 2017)
Us Against You (sequel to Beartown: June 2018)
 Folk med ångest (2019; English Translation Anxious People, September 2020)
 Vinnarna (English translationThe Winners (last in Beartown trilogy: September 2022)

References

External links
 Fredrik Backman's Website 
 
 Fredrik Backman on Twitter
 Fredrik Backman on Instagram
 Fredrik Backman on Facebook

1981 births
Living people
21st-century Swedish novelists
Swedish journalists
Swedish male novelists
Swedish satirists